Harold David Judge (1936–2015), also known as David Judge, was an Irish-born Great Britain and Ireland men's field hockey international who represented Great Britain at the 1964 Summer Olympics, and between 1957 and 1978 made 124 senior appearances for Ireland. He also represented Ireland at the 1970 and 1972 EuroHockey Nations Championships and at the 1978 Men's Hockey World Cup. In 2006 he was inducted into the inaugural Irish Hockey Association Hall of Fame.

Early life
Judge was raised in Rathgar. He had three siblings – two sisters, Sylvia and Maeve and a brother, Norman. His earliest introduction to field hockey was playing the game in the back garden with Norman. Judge was educated at Avoca School, Portora Royal School and Trinity College Dublin.

Domestic teams

Early years
Judge was a schoolboy field hockey player with both Avoca School and Portora Royal School. He also represented Ulster at schoolboy level.

Dublin University
While studying at Trinity College Dublin, Judge played for Dublin University. He was also selected to play for the Buccaneers touring team. In 2011 Judge was inducted into the Dublin University Hockey Club Hall of Fame.

Three Rock Rovers
After graduating from Trinity, Judge played for Three Rock Rovers, helping them win the Irish Senior Cup on several occasions.

International

Ireland
Between 1957 and 1978 Judge made 124 senior appearances for Ireland, making his debut for Ireland in an away game against Scotland. He represented Ireland at the 1970 and 1972 EuroHockey Nations Championships and at the 1978 Men's Hockey World Cup. He also captained Ireland on 30 occasions and helped them win the 1972 Santander Trophy. In 2006 Judge was inducted into the inaugural Irish Hockey Association Hall of Fame. Other inductees included his former Ireland and Great Britain teammate, Harry Cahill, alongside Maeve Kyle and Thelma Hopkins.

Great Britain
Together with fellow Ireland international, Harry Cahill, Judge represented Great Britain at the 1964 Summer Olympics. In December 1963 he toured India and Ceylon with Great Britain.

Later life
In 1981 Judge participated in Ireland's version of Superstars, competing against, amongst others, Declan Burns, Bernard Brogan and Barry McGuigan. In the final, Judge won the rowing event.

After his retirement as a field hockey player, Judge served as a coach at both Avoca and Old Alex, guiding both teams to club titles. He also served as president of the Leinster Hockey Association, overseeing the merger of the women's and men's branches. He also served as an assistant coach with the Ireland men.

Judge died on 17 October 2015, aged 79. He was survived by his wife Grania and four children.

Honours
Ireland
Santander Trophy
Winners: 1972: 1
Men's Intercontinental Cup
Runners-up: 1977

References

External links
 

1936 births
2015 deaths
Irish male field hockey players
Ireland international men's field hockey players
British male field hockey players
Olympic field hockey players of Great Britain
Field hockey players at the 1964 Summer Olympics
1978 Men's Hockey World Cup players
Male field hockey defenders
Dublin University Hockey Club players
Three Rock Rovers Hockey Club players
Field hockey players from County Dublin
Irish field hockey coaches
Irish field hockey administrators
People educated at Portora Royal School
Alumni of Trinity College Dublin
Sportspeople from Dún Laoghaire–Rathdown